Companeez, Kompaniyets, is a Ukrainian surname. Companeez is a French form of the surname. Notable people with the surname include:

Jacques Companeez (1906–1956), Russian (Ukrainian)-born French screenwriter
Nina Companeez (1937–2015), French screenwriter and film director
Viktor Kompaniyets

Ukrainian-language surnames